James Harry Funnell (born 31 May 1999) is an English cricketer. He made his List A debut for Leicestershire against India A in a tri-series warm-up match on 19 June 2018.

References

External links
 

1999 births
Living people
English cricketers
Leicestershire cricketers
Cricketers from Leicester